Mark Andrea de Cataldo is an Italian mathematician.

De Cataldo earned a doctorate from the University of Notre Dame in 1995, and began teaching at Stony Brook University in 1998–1999, after completing postdoctoral research at the Washington University in St. Louis, the Max Planck Institute for Mathematics, and Harvard University. He is a member of the Institute for Advanced Study and has been awarded the Simons Foundation fellowship. In 2019, de Cataldo was elected a fellow of the American Mathematical Society.

References

20th-century Italian mathematicians
21st-century Italian mathematicians
Mathematicians from New York (state)
Fellows of the American Mathematical Society
Italian algebraic geometers
Living people
Stony Brook University faculty
Italian expatriates in the United States
Notre Dame College of Arts and Letters alumni
Year of birth missing (living people)
Washington University in St. Louis fellows